Ricardo Álvarez may refer to:

Footballers
 Ricardo Álvarez (footballer, born 1897) (1897–1955), Spanish winger
 Ricardo Álvarez (Mexican footballer) (1911–1986), Mexican forward
 Ricardo Álvarez (footballer, born 1957), Spanish midfielder
 Richy (footballer) (Ricardo Álvarez Puig, born 1984), Spanish centre-back
 Ricky Álvarez (born 1988), Argentine attacking midfielder
 Ricardo Álvarez (Chilean footballer) (born 1999), Chilean midfielder

Others
 Ricardo Álvarez-Rivón (born c. 1950), Puerto Rican comic artist
 Ricardo Álvarez Arias (born 1963), Honduran vice president
 Ricardo Álvarez (boxer) (Ricardo Álvarez Barragán, born 1981), Mexican boxer